The Bombay City Improvement Trust (BIT) was created on 9 December 1898, in response to the Bombay plague epidemic of 1896. It was created through an Act of the Parliament. The Municipal Corporation and the government handed over all vacant lands to this body. The CIT undertook a host of measures to improve sanitary and living conditions in the city. The planned opening up of suburbs was due to the Trust. 

The CIT widened roads in the central, crowded, parts of the town. A new east-west road, the Princess Street, was constructed to channel the sea air into the centre of the crowded residential areas. The north-south Sydenham Road (now Mohammedali Road) was also constructed with this end in view. 

The Dadar-Matunga-Wadala-Sion suburban development was started in 1899 with the express purpose of relieving congestion to the south. Well-laid out plots, with mixed land-use patterns marked these sections. Completed in 1900, access to these parts were through the newly completed Mohammedali Road.

See also
Bombay plague epidemic

References
The Bombay City Improvement Trust {GFDL site}

History of Mumbai